= Sarah Lafferty =

American costume designer, puppeteer and performing artist

Sarah Lafferty is an American costume designer, puppeteer and performing artist.
